Cygnus A (3C 405) is a radio galaxy, and one of the strongest radio sources in the sky. A concentrated radio source in Cygnus was discovered by Grote Reber in 1939. In 1946 Stanley Hey and his colleague James Phillips identified that the source scintillated rapidly, and must therefore be a compact object. In 1951, Cygnus A, along with Cassiopeia A, and Puppis A were the first "radio stars" identified with an optical source. Of these, Cygnus A became the first radio galaxy, the other two being nebulae inside the Milky Way. In 1953 Roger Jennison and M K Das Gupta showed it to be a double source. Like all radio galaxies, it contains an active galactic nucleus.

Images of the galaxy in the radio portion of the electromagnetic spectrum show two jets protruding in opposite directions from the galaxy's center. These jets extend many times the width of the portion of the host galaxy which emits radiation at visible wavelengths. At the ends of the jets are two lobes with "hot spots" of more intense radiation at their edges. These hot spots are formed when material from the jets collides with the surrounding intergalactic medium.

In 2016, a radio transient was discovered 460 parsecs away from the center of Cygnus A. Between 1989 and 2016, the object, cospatial with a previously-known infrared source, exhibited at least an eightfold increase in radio flux density, with comparable luminosity to the brightest known supernova. Due to the lack of measurements in the intervening years, the rate of brightening is unknown, but the object has remained at a relatively constant flux density since its discovery. The data are consistent with a second supermassive black hole orbiting the primary object, with the secondary having undergone a rapid accretion rate increase. The inferred orbital timescale is of the same order as the activity of the primary source, suggesting the secondary may be perturbing the primary and causing the outflows.

See also 
 List of galaxies
 List of nearest galaxies

References

Further reading

External links 

Information about Cygnus A from SIMBAD.
Hubble Uncovers a Hidden Quasar in a Nearby Galaxy (Cygnus A)
A primitive transit recording (7 July 1998) of Cygnus A by English radio amateur Geoff Royle G4FAS

405.0
Cygnus (constellation)
Radio galaxies
Quasars